English Little League is the 19th album by Dayton, Ohio rock group Guided by Voices.

In a July 2013 interview with Magnet magazine, Robert Pollard hinted that English Little League would be the final Guided by Voices album. A 20th album Motivational Jumpsuit was then released in 2014.

Track listing

Charts

References

Guided by Voices albums
2013 albums
Self-released albums
Fire Records (UK) albums